Glory By Honor IX was a professional wrestling pay-per-view (PPV) event produced by Ring of Honor (ROH), which was only available online. It took place on September 11, 2010, at the Manhattan Center in New York City. This was the ninth event entitled Glory By Honor produced by ROH, but was the first broadcast live online.

Production

Background

In July 2010, ROH announced that Glory By Honor IX would be taking place in the Grand Ballroom at the Manhattan Center in New York City on September 11, 2010, and would be live on internet pay-per-view through GoFightLive.

ROH announced that, prior to the show, there would be a special autograph signing with Terry Funk.

Storylines
Glory By Honor IX featured professional wrestling matches that involved different wrestlers from existing, scripted feuds and storylines. Wrestlers were portrayed as villains or heroes, or more ambiguous characters in scripted contests that built tension and culminated in a wrestling match on the pay-per-view.

Results

See also
2010 in professional wrestling
List of Ring of Honor pay-per-view events

References

External links
Official Glory By Honor IX website
Ring of Honor's official website

Ring of Honor pay-per-view events
Events in New York City
2010 in New York City
9
Professional wrestling in New York City
September 2010 events in the United States
2010 Ring of Honor pay-per-view events